Ranuccio Farnese (1509–1529) was the natural son of Alessandro Farnese by Silvia Ruffini, born before his father was elected pope as Paul III. His siblings were Pier Luigi, Paolo and Costanza.

External links
Ranuccio on the Farnese family tree 

1509 births
1529 deaths
Ranuccio
Papal family members